The 2016 Tour d'Azerbaïdjan was a five-day cycling stage race that took place in Azerbaijan in May 2016. The race is the fifth edition of the Tour d'Azerbaïdjan. It was rated as a 2.1 event as part of the 2016 UCI Europe Tour. The race included five stages, starting in Baku on 4 May and returning there for the finish on 8 May.

The race was won by Markus Eibegger. He finished the race 2 seconds ahead of Rinaldo Nocentini, with Nikita Stalnov third. Eibegger's teammate Daniel Schorn won a stage and the points classification, while Synergy Baku won both the team classification and the mountains classification through Alex Surutkovich. The youth classification was won by Ildar Arslanov.

Schedule

Participating teams 
Twenty-one (21) teams participated in the 2016 edition of the Tour d'Azerbaïdjan.

Classification leadership

References

External links 
 Official website

Tour d'Azerbaïdjan
Tour d'Azerbaidjan
Tour d'Azerbaidjan